The 2019 Texas A&M–Commerce Lions football team represented Texas A&M University–Commerce as a member of the Lone Star Conference (LSC) the 2019 NCAA Division II football season. They were first-year head coach David Bailiff. Bailiff replaced Colby Carthel, who left Commerce to become the head football coach at Stephen F. Austin State University. The Lions compiled an overall record an 11–3 with a mark of 7–1 in conference play, placing second in the LSC. Texas A&M–Commerce qualified for the NCAA Division II Football Championship playoffs for the fifth straight season and the eighth time  since joining the NCAA in 1982. They finished as national quarterfinalists for the third time in program history.

Previous season

The 2018 team finished the season with an overall record of 10–3. In conference play, the team went 7–1, finishing in second place in the Lone Star Conference. The team made the NCAA Division II Playoffs, losing to Tarleton State in the regional semifinal.

Personnel

Schedule
Texas A&M–Commerce announced its 2019 football schedule in January 2019. The Lions played 11 regular season games and finished the regular season 9-2. They were ranked as high as 11th during the season.

Game summaries

Selección Nuevo Leon

at Western Oregon

Eastern New Mexico

at No. 20 Colorado State–Pueblo

at Texas A&M–Kingsville

Midwestern State

at No. 4 Tarleton State

Western New Mexico

at West Texas A&M

at Angelo State

at No. 3 Tarleton State (Regional Quarterfinal)

at No. 7 Colorado Mines (Regional semifinal)

at No. 4 Minnesota State (Regional final)

Rankings

Postseason awards

All-Americans
Dominique Ramsey, First Team All-Purpose
Amon Simon, Second Team Defensive Line

All-Lone Star Conference

LSC Superlatives
Academic Player of The Year: Alex Shillow
Offensive Lineman of The Year: Amon Simon

LSC First Team
Deion Malone, Offensive Line
Amon Simon, Offensive Line
Antonio Leali'ie'i, Running Back 
Dominique Ramsey, Kick Returner & Defensive Back
Kader Kohou, Defensive Back

LSC Second Team
Miklo Smalls, Quarterback 
Ryan Stokes, Receiver 
Jake Viquez, Place Kicker
Chris Williams, Defensive Line
Jaylon Hodge, Defensive Line
Terrell Collins, Linebacker
Alex Shillow, Safety

LSC Honorable Mention
Christian Hernandez, Offensive Line
Tyler Guice, Tight End
Chance Cooper, Receiver 
LA Dawson, Cornerback
Andrew Gomez, Punter
Wyatt Leath, Deep Snapper

References

Texas AandM-Commerce
Texas A&M–Commerce Lions football seasons
Texas AandM-Commerce Lions football